This is a list of cinemas in the city of Mumbai, India.  Mumbai has long been associated with films, with the first film being displayed here in 1896 by the Lumière Brothers.It thereafter became the centre of India's Hindi and Marathi language film industries, with the former often dubbed as Bollywood. The first cinema opened in 1913.Mumbai has many cinemas catering to a large and polyglot population. Cinemas often serve as major landmarks in the city and define the neighbourhood. Most of the cinemas in the city are one-screen halls, but in recent times these have been giving way to large multiplexes. 

Recently some cinemas, (often interchangeably called "theatres") have been forced to shut shop due to the high entertainment tax (which stands at 55%),  that results in huge losses. Since 2000, 50 cinemas have shut down in the city. Mumbai is known for its entertainment industry so there are a lot of cinemas. Such One Example is Maratha Mandir which is known for playing Dilwale Dulhania Le Jayenge for almost 26 yearsbeing a single screen cinema and Multiplexes. There are also IMAX venues, namely BIG Cinemas, PVR Cinemas, Cinépolis IMAX in Thane.

Single-screen theatres

Multiplexes

4DX

References 

 
Cinemas in Mumbai
Movie Theatres
Mumbai
Movie theatres in Mumbai